Dafen is a suburb of Buji, Longgang, Shenzhen, in the province of Guangdong, China. Since 1989, the area has been an artists' village for the production of replicas of masterworks and outsourcing of original art creation as a specialised urban cottage industry.

History
In 1989, the painter Huang Jiang started copying paintings and has since been considered the founder of Dafen's replica industry. In the early 1990s, a group of about twenty artists who trained at art academies took up residence under the leadership of businessman Huang Jiang. They  produced dozens of replicas daily of oil paintings by masters such as Van Gogh, Dalí, Leonardo da Vinci, Rembrandt, and Warhol.
In the 1990s, Huang sent a painting to Walmart and received an order of 50,000 paintings, which he had to produce within fourteen days.

After the financial crisis, Western demand declined and domestic buyers ordered Chinese art copies, forcing a change in style. 
As of 2014, 7,000 artists were based in Dafen, living and working in the factories, copying paintings, and five million paintings were being exported to the US and Europe per year. Some artists can finish up to 100 paintings in twelve hours.
In 2018, 8,000 people lived in Dafen, and the local government promised to develop it into a tourist destination.

A 2019 publication estimated the Dafen area produced revenues of around $630 million annually. Previously, talent was needed in the production, but the village has innovated with "large-scale printers and clusters of tablets and phones used for templating", so that minimal training is required.

Replicas
Official policy states that the replicas produced at Dafen Oil Painting Village are copied from artists who have died more than fifty years ago, and consequently out of copyright. However, the artists copied include Georgia O'Keeffe, who died in 1986. Knockoffs of contemporary artists such as Botero and Yue Minjun are also sold.

The village sells both originals and replicas. It is possible to commission paintings for low prices. The settlement is a gated community, recognizable by the large sculpture of a hand holding a paintbrush outside its gates.

References

Further reading
 
 
 J. Wang & S.M Li (2017). "State territorialization, neoliberal governmentality: the remaking of Dafen oil painting village, Shenzhen, China." Urban Geography Volume 38, Issue 5: Interpreting China's new urban spaces: State, market, and society in action. Pages 708-728. Published online on March 2, 2016.

External links

 Oil Painting Gallery: China Romandy Art
 "China to the Rescue? Not!", by Thomas L. Friedman, The New York Times, 20 December 2008
  14-minute video about Dafen
 

Contemporary art galleries in China
Chinese painting
Culture in Shenzhen
Chinese contemporary art